Irthington Castle was a castle located near Irthington, Cumbria, England.

History
The barony of Gilsland was granted to Hubert I de Vaux in 1157 by King Henry II of England. A timber motte and bailey castle was built by either Hubert or his son Robert. The castle was the caput of the barony of Gilsland until the 14th century, with Ranulph de Dacre, Baron Dacre moving the caput to Naworth Castle in 1335.

References
Salter, Mike. The Castles and Tower Houses of Cumbria. Folly Publications, Malvern. 1998. p. 62.

Castles in Cumbria
De Vaux family